Nicholas Christodoulou (born 16 February 2005), is a Canadian racing driver of Cypriot descent currently competing in the 2022 GB3 Championship with Arden Motorsport. He competed in the first two rounds of the 2022 Formula Regional Americas Championship with Velocity Racing Development (VRD), and made his debut in the GB3 Championship later in the year as a result of the collaboration between VRD and Arden Motorsport.

Career

Karting
In 2019, Christodoulou competed in the Junior ROK category of the Florida Winter Tour with Goodwood Kartways, where he came 37th with 355 points.

NACAM Formula 4
Christodoulou competed in the NACAM Formula 4 Championship in the 2018-19 season with FyF Racing, and continued in the championship in the 2019-20 season, with Scuderia Martiga EG. He was 4th in the 2018-19 standings, and second in the 2019-20 standings, with three wins.

U.S. F2000 National Championship
Christodoulou competed in the Road America round and the New Jersey Motorsports Park round of the 2020 U.S. F2000 National Championship with DEForce Racing.

Formula 4 United States Championship
Christodoulou raced in the 2020 Formula 4 United States Championship with DEForce Racing, where he came 7th in the overall championship standings. He switched to Velocity Racing Development for 2022, where he finished 4th in the standings with two wins.

Formula Regional Americas Championship
Christodoulou continued with Velocity Racing Development into 2022, where he competed in the 2022 Formula Regional Americas Championship. However, he withdrew from the championship after the second round.

GB3 Championship
Following the collaboration announcement between Velocity Racing Development and Arden Motorsport, Christodoulou joined Arden in the 2022 GB3 Championship from Round 3.

Racing record

Karting career summary

Racing career summary

† As Christodoulou was a guest driver, he was ineligible for championship points.
* Season still in progress.

Complete GB3 Championship results 
(key) (Races in bold indicate pole position) (Races in italics indicate fastest lap)

References

External links
 
 

2005 births
Living people
Sportspeople from Ontario
Canadian racing drivers
Racing drivers from Ontario
BRDC British Formula 3 Championship drivers
U.S. F2000 National Championship drivers
Arden International drivers
People from King, Ontario
Formula Regional Americas Championship drivers
Canadian people of Greek Cypriot descent
United States F4 Championship drivers
NACAM F4 Championship drivers